In mathematics, the Glaisher–Kinkelin constant or Glaisher's constant, typically denoted , is a mathematical constant, related to the -function and the Barnes -function.  The constant appears in a number of sums and integrals, especially those involving gamma functions and zeta functions. It is named after mathematicians James Whitbread Lee Glaisher and Hermann Kinkelin.

Its approximate value is:
 = ...   .

The Glaisher–Kinkelin constant  can be given by the limit:

where  is the hyperfactorial.

An equivalent definition for  involving the Barnes -function, given by  where  is the gamma function is:
.
The Glaisher–Kinkelin constant also appears in evaluations of the derivatives of the Riemann zeta function, such as:

 

where  is the Euler–Mascheroni constant. The latter formula leads directly to the following product found by Glaisher:

 

An alternative product formula, defined over the prime numbers, reads 

 

where  denotes the th prime number.

The following are some integrals that involve this constant:

 

 

A series representation for this constant follows from a series for the Riemann zeta function given by Helmut Hasse.

References

 
 (Provides a variety of relationships.)

External links
 The Glaisher–Kinkelin constant to 20,000 decimal places

Mathematical constants
Number theory
Glaisher family